Walsall was a borough constituency centred on the town of Walsall in the West Midlands of England.  It returned one Member of Parliament (MP) to the House of Commons of the Parliament of the United Kingdom, elected by the first past the post voting system.

Boundaries 
Throughout its existence, the seat included the entirety of the County Borough of Walsall. In 1955, it was split into Walsall North and Walsall South

Members of Parliament

Elections

Elections in the 1830s

Elections in the 1840s
Finch resigned by accepting the office of Steward of the Chiltern Hundreds, causing a by-election.

Elections in the 1850s

Elections in the 1860s

Elections in the 1870s

Elections in the 1880s

Elections in the 1890s 
Forster's death caused a by-election.

The election was declared void on petition.

Elections in the 1900s

Elections in the 1910s 

General Election 1914–15:
Another General Election was required to take place before the end of 1915. The political parties had been making preparations for an election to take place and by the July 1914, the following candidates had been selected; 
Unionist: Richard Cooper
Liberal: William Henry Brown

 Cooper founded the National Party and had the support of the local Unionist Association. However, his candidature was not supported by Unionist party HQ or the Coalition Government.

Elections in the 1920s

Elections in the 1930s 

Conservative candidate, William J Talbot, withdrew.

Elections in the 1940s 
General Election 1939–40:

Another General Election was required to take place before the end of 1940. The political parties had been making preparations for an election and by the end of the Autumn of 1939, the following candidates had been selected; 
Liberal National: George Schuster
Labour: A J Stanley

Elections in the 1950s

References 

Politics of Walsall
Parliamentary constituencies in the West Midlands (county) (historic)
Parliamentary constituencies in Staffordshire (historic)
Constituencies of the Parliament of the United Kingdom established in 1832
Constituencies of the Parliament of the United Kingdom disestablished in 1955